Ensemble is a liberal political coalition in France. Formed in November 2021 as Ensemble Citoyens, it includes Renaissance (RE), formerly known as En Marche, Democratic Movement (MoDem) Horizons, En commun, and the Progressive Federation. The coalition included the parties Agir and Territories of Progress (TDP) until they were merged into the rebranded Renaissance. Ensemble has mainly been described as being centrist, and sometimes as centre-right on the political spectrum.

History 

François Bayrou, the leader of the Democratic Movement (MoDem) has previously proposed the formation of a coalition that would include centrist and centre-right parties. In November 2021, president of the National Assembly, Richard Ferrand, accepted his proposal and together they had formed Ensemble Citoyens. Besides the Democratic Movement and Renaissance, Agir was also its founding member. In the following month, they were joined by the Radical Party, Horizons, Territories of Progress, and En Commun.

From its foundation in November, the coalition has been headed by Ferrand as its leader, Bayrou and Édouard Philippe as vice-presidents, and Stanislas Guerini as secretary-general. Jean Castex has also affiliated himself with the coalition. Philippe suspended its participation in the coalition on 14 January 2022, although, four days later he had announced that his party was reinstated into the coalition. In April, LREM announced that it would change its party name to "Renaissance", and a month later, the name of the coalition was shortened to just Ensemble. The Progressive Federation joined the coalition in May 2022.

Members

Objectives 
The coalition aimed to bring the presidential majority of Emmanuel Macron together in order to present its joint candidates for the 2022 French legislative election. In May 2022, Ferrand indicated their commitment for "a stable majority in the National Assembly", while Philippe specified that the program of Ensemble "is that of the Macron". Bayrou indicated that the parties would form a joint parliamentary group in the National Assembly, however Renaissance, MoDem, and Horizons each formed separate parliamentary groups following the legislative elections.  Some media sources consider it as a modern incarnation of Valéry Giscard d'Estaing's Union for French Democracy (UDF), founded in 1978.

Electoral history

Legislative elections

See also 
 Political coalition

References 

2021 establishments in France
Liberal parties in France
Centrist parties in France
Centre-right parties in Europe
Political parties established in 2021
Political parties of the French Fifth Republic
Political party alliances in France
Pro-European political parties in France